Statistics of Moldovan National Division for the 1999–2000 season.

Overview
It was contested by 10 teams and Zimbru Chişinău won the championship.

League standings

Results

First and second round

Third and fourth round

Goalscorers

References
Moldova - List of final tables (RSSSF)

Moldovan Super Liga seasons
1999–2000 in Moldovan football
Moldova